Tagged: The Jonathan Wamback Story is a 2002 Canadian drama television film directed by John L'Ecuyer, based on a true story about Jonathan Wamback who, in 1999, was beaten by a group of teenagers and left to die near his Newmarket home. The film stars Tyler Hynes, Christopher Jacot, Ron White, Marnie McPhail, Janet-Laine Green, and Charlotte Sullivan.

Plot
On his first day of high school, by intervening in a bullying incident and catching the interest of Courtney, Jonathan Wamback runs afoul of Kyle, who is the leader of the school gang (Skulls) and Courtney's boyfriend. Later, Jonathan's mother Lozanne find Kyle and his gang lighting cherry bombs in the park and harassing small children. She follows Kyle home and tells his mother, who refuses to believe it.

Jonathan is then approached by Gord Nelson and Jeff Walters, two cool guys who claim to be forming a group to stand up to Kyle's gang. When the three come across Skulls' graffiti on a wall, Jonathan paints over it. Gord paints racist remarks over another Skulls tag and the gang assumes that it was Jonathan. Using a phone call from Courtney, the gang lures Jonathan to the park, where they beat him so severely that he incurs brain damage and is put on life support. Lozanne and Jonathan's father, Joe, help to care for him; as he begins to recuperate, Joe lobbies to have the Young Offenders Act rewritten to impose harsher penalties for violent crime. Eventually, Jonathan returns to school to prove that despite everything, he's no longer a victim.

Cast
 Tyler Hynes as Jonathan Wamback
 Christopher Jacot as Kyle Simpson
 Ron White as Joe Wamback
 Marnie McPhail as Lozanne Wamback
 Janet-Laine Green as Nora Simpson
 Charlotte Sullivan as Courtney Henderson
 Al Mukadam as Toby Migure
 J. Adam Brown as Gord Nelson
 Dan Warry-Smith as Jeff Walters
 Craig Hustler as Donald Glover
 Mpho Koaho as Trevor Smith
 Jonathan Rosenberg as Ben Luekens
 Sugith Varughese as Taj Gibson
 Tamsin Kelsey as Cindy
 Alison Sealy-Smith as Maureen
 James Kall as Dr Bowman
 Colin Fox as Michael Jordan
 Maria Ricossa as Judge Joe Brown
 Edwina Renout as Jet Li
 Yank Azman as Duty Counsel
 Ryan Booth as Cop
 Lori Nancy Kalamanski as Nurse Jackie
 Paul Sun-Hyung Lee as Doctor
 Richard Waugh as Radio Host
 Karen Woolridge as Reporter

Awards and nominations

References

External links
 

2002 films
2002 drama films
2002 television films
2000s Canadian films
2000s English-language films
2000s high school films
Canadian drama television films
Canadian films based on actual events
Canadian high school films
CTV Television Network original programming
Drama films based on actual events
English-language Canadian films
Films about bullying
Films about school violence
Films directed by John L'Ecuyer
Films scored by Mark Korven
Films set in Ontario
Films shot in Ontario
Television films based on actual events